In geology, a boulder (or rarely bowlder) is a rock fragment with size greater than  in diameter. Smaller pieces are called cobbles and pebbles. While a boulder may be small enough to move or roll manually, others are extremely massive. 
In common usage, a boulder is too large for a person to move. Smaller boulders are usually just called rocks or stones. The word boulder derives from boulder stone, from the Middle English bulderston or Swedish bullersten.

In places covered by ice sheets during ice ages, such as Scandinavia, northern North America, and Siberia,  glacial erratics are common.  Erratics are boulders picked up by ice sheets during their advance, and deposited when they melt.   These boulders are called "erratic" because they typically are of a different rock type than the bedrock on which they are deposited.  One such boulder is used as the pedestal of the Bronze Horseman in Saint Petersburg, Russia.

Some noted rock formations involve giant boulders exposed by erosion, such as the Devil's Marbles in Australia's Northern Territory, the Horeke basalts in New Zealand, where an entire valley contains only boulders, and The Baths on the island of Virgin Gorda in the British Virgin Islands.

Boulder-sized clasts are found in some sedimentary rocks, such as coarse conglomerate and boulder clay.

The climbing of large boulders is called bouldering.

See also
 Moeraki Boulders
 Monolith
 Udden–Wentworth scale

References

External links

Rocks
Rock formations
Garden features
Natural materials